Perry Township is one of eleven townships in Monroe County, Indiana, United States. As of the 2010 census, its population was 50,673 and it contained 24,194 housing units.

History
Perry Township was established in 1830. It was named for Commodore Oliver Hazard Perry.

Geography

Cities, towns, villages
 Bloomington (southern half of the city, south of [approximately] Third Street)

Unincorporated towns
 Broadview at 
 Clear Creek at 
 Handy at 
 Hoosier Acres at 
 Ridgemede at 
 Sanders at 
 Sunny Slopes at 
(This list is based on USGS data and may include former settlements.)

Cemeteries
The township contains Mount Salem Cemetery.

Major highways
  Indiana State Road 37
  Indiana State Road 45
  Indiana State Road 46

School districts
 Monroe County Community School Corporation

Political districts
 Indiana's 9th congressional district
 State House District 60
 State House District 61
 State Senate District 40

Gallery

References
 
 United States Census Bureau 2008 TIGER/Line Shapefiles
 IndianaMap

External links
 Indiana Township Association
 United Township Association of Indiana
 City-Data.com page for Perry Township

Townships in Monroe County, Indiana
Bloomington metropolitan area, Indiana
Townships in Indiana